Peter John Tripp CMG (27 March 1921 – 11 December 2010) was a British diplomat.

Biography

Born in 1921, Peter Tripp was educated at Bedford School.  He served in the Royal Marines during the Second World War and in the Sudan Political Service between 1946 and 1954, when he joined the British Diplomatic Service. He was Political Agent in the Trucial States between 1955 and 1958, Head of Chancery in Vienna between  1958 and 1961, and served in various diplomatic posts in Bahrain and Amman between 1961 and 1968, before being appointed as Head of the Near Eastern Department at the Foreign Office in London between 1968 and 1970.  It was during this period that he became intimately involved in the diplomatic handling of the Black September hijackings and the detention of Leila Khaled in London in September 1970.

Tripp was British Ambassador to Libya between 1970 and 1974, British High Commissioner to Singapore between 1974 and 1978, and British Ambassador to Thailand between 1978 and 1981.

References

1921 births
2010 deaths
People educated at Bedford School
Ambassadors of the United Kingdom to Thailand
Ambassadors of the United Kingdom to Libya
High Commissioners of the United Kingdom to Singapore
Members of HM Diplomatic Service
Companions of the Order of St Michael and St George
Sudan Political Service officers
Royal Marines personnel of World War II
British expatriates in the United Arab Emirates
British expatriates in Austria
British expatriates in Bahrain
British expatriates in Jordan
20th-century British diplomats